Sölvesborgs GoIF is a Swedish football club located in Sölvesborg in Blekinge.

Background
Sölvesborgs Gymnastik-och Idrottsförening were founded on 13 October 1915.

Since their foundation Sölvesborgs GoIF has participated mainly in the middle divisions of the Swedish football league system.  For 3 seasons over the period 1967–69 SGIF played in Division 2 Södra Götaland which at that time was the second tier of Swedish football.  The club currently plays in Division 2 Södra Götaland which is now the fourth tier of Swedish football. They play their home matches at the Svarta Led in Sölvesborg.

Sölvesborgs GoIF are affiliated to the Blekinge Fotbollförbund.  SGIF have two men's teams, the first team and FC Giffarna.  The club alo runs an active youth section serving 400 young people.

Kalmar FF player Abiola Dauda played previously for SGIF making 35 appearances for the club in the period 2006–08.

Season to season

Attendances

In recent seasons Sölvesborgs GoIF have had the following average attendances:

Footnotes

External links
 Sölvesborgs GoIF – Official website

Football clubs in Blekinge County
Association football clubs established in 1915
1915 establishments in Sweden